Komsomolske is an urban-type settlement located in Simferopol Municipality, Crimea. Population:

See also
Simferopol Municipality

References

Urban-type settlements in Crimea
Simferopol Municipality